Service Year Alliance is an American nonprofit organization headquartered in Washington, D.C.

History
The organization was formed in 2016 through the merger of three historical national service efforts (the Franklin Project at the Aspen Institute, Service Nation and the Service Year Exchange project of the National Conference on Citizenship).

In March 2018 the organization acquired the AmeriCorps Alums program from Points of Light.

Campaigns

Stop National Service Extinction
Service Year Alliance launched a campaign to save funding for national service. The campaign culminated on August 30, 2017, with over 100 volunteers dressed in inflatable dinosaur costumes across Washington, D.C., raising awareness during the morning commute and then coming together at the capitol.

Let National Service Soar
Service Year Alliance launched a campaign to grow funding for national service. The campaign culminated on May 7, 2018, with over 100 volunteers dressed in inflatable eagle costumes across Washington, D.C., raising awareness during the morning commute and then coming together at the capitol.

Serve America Together
Serve America Together is a campaign connected to the 2020 United States presidential election to make national service part of growing up in America. Coalition partners include Student Veterans of America, The Mission Continues, the National Peace Corps Association, YouthBuild, Teach for America. The Co-chairs of the campaign are Stanley McChrystal, Arianna Huffington, Robert Gates, Laura Lauder, Andrew Hauptman and Deval Patrick. On July 8, 2019, Pete Buttigieg became the first candidate to accept the Serve America Together challenge; on August 27, 2019,  Kirsten Gillibrand became the second candidate to accept the Serve America Together challenge; and on September 17, 2019, Tom Steyer became the third candidate to accept the Serve America Together Challenge.

Initiatives

National Service and American Democracy
Service Year Alliance partnered with Arizona State University to create the three-credit online and in-person course about American democracy and civic engagement.

Service + Tech
Service Year Alliance launched Service + Tech initiative on December 11, 2018. Funding provided by Schmidt Futures, SAP, and Cisco. Founding corps were the Corporation for National and Community Service, AmeriCorps, Teach For America, City Year, Reading & Math Inc., Public Allies, the National Peace Corps Association, and Citizen Schools. Founding training partners were Per Scholas, Make School, General Assembly, Northeaster's Align Program, Code for America, and LinkedIn.

References

Non-profit organizations based in Washington, D.C.
Organizations established in 2016